Yalçın Kayan (born 30 January 1999 in Konak, Turkey) is a Turkish professional footballer who plays as a midfielder for Göztepe.

Professional career
Kayan made his professional debut for in a 2-0 Süper Lig win over Kayserispor on 15 September 2018.

References

External links
Soccerway Profile
TFF Profile
Mackolik Profile

1999 births
Living people
People from Konak
Turkish footballers
Göztepe S.K. footballers
Süper Lig players
Association football midfielders